Cornish devolution is the movement to increase the governing powers of the County of Cornwall.

History of Cornish devolution and status

Origin of English rule 
In 1066, much of Cornwall was invaded by the Normans and Brian of Brittany may have been made earl of Cornwall by William the Conqueror and some Cornish people returned to Cornwall from Brittany following prior invasion by the Anglo-Saxons.

The peerage of the Earl of Cornwall was created and first appointed to Condor of Cornwall, a survivor of the royal lineage of Cornwall.

Duchy of Cornwall 

The Duchy of Cornwall was formed in 1337 by English king Edward III for his first born son, Prince Edward and a charter stated this would continue in the same manner for each eldest son of the English monarch. The Duke of Cornwall is the title given to the holder of the Duchy of Cornwall and the Duke holds some rights in Cornwall and owns the coastline and riverbeds around Cornwall as well as the significant profits from which are produced. These profits contribute to financial support of the English Duke of Cornwall.

Cornish rebellion and Stannery Parliament 

In 1497, Michael Joseph An Gof and Thomas Flamank and a Cornish army marched upon London in protest of raised taxes by Henry VII who aimed to increase funding for a war against the Scots. The Cornish army was defeated and An Gof and Flamank were both executed. However, the rebellion may have influenced the decision by the Henry VII to introduce the Charter of Pardon in 1508 which gave powers to the Convocation of the Tinners of Cornwall (commonly known as the Stannary Parliaments) to veto English legislation in Cornwall.

Local Government Act 1888 
The Local Government Act 1888 established Cornwall as an administrative county and established Cornwall County Council.

Modern Cornish devolution movement

Local authority devolution 
In 2015 Cornwall became the first county of England to receive new devolved powers which included;
Powers for Cornwall Council to franchise and improve bus services
Health and Social care integration plan for Cornwall Council and Isles of Scilly Council
Council selection of projects for multi-million-pound investment
Cornwall and Isles of Scilly Local Enterprise Partnership (LEP) increased input for improving skills
Streamlining LEP's abilities to integrate local and national services to strengthen companies in Cornwall.

2016 Cornish language powers 
In 2016 authority for the Cornish language (recognised under the Charter for Regional and Minority Languages in 2003) was transferred to Cornwall Council from the central government.

2022 further devolved power transfer and Meryon 
In December 2022 at Spaceport Cornwall Dehenna Davison the Parliamentary-Under Secretary of State for Levelling Up announced a package worth £360m transferring building and skills powers to Cornwall Council. The deal would also give Cornwall a directly elected regional Mayor (Meryon in Cornish) akin to that of Greater London. The powers are designed to give the council and Mayor/Meryon "greater control over transport budgets, building, skills delivery, and greater influence with government to tackle challenges of second homes"

Calls for further devolution

Cornish Assembly/Parliament 

The Cornish Constitutional Convention was formed in 2000 as a cross-party organisation including representatives from the private, public and voluntary sectors to campaign for the creation of a Cornish Assembly, along the lines of the National Assembly for Wales, Northern Ireland Assembly and the Scottish Parliament. Between 5 March 2000 and December 2001, the campaign collected the signatures of 41,650 Cornish residents endorsing the call for a devolved assembly, along with 8,896 signatories from outside Cornwall. The resulting petition was presented to the Prime Minister, Tony Blair.

Cornish party Mebyon Kernow has called for the creation of a Cornish Assembly or parliament in light of the G7 summit in Cornwall, stating: "...what better legacy could there be than parity with the other Celtic parts of the UK, such as Scotland and Wales, in terms of influence and investment, and a comprehensive devolution deal, which would deliver a Cornish Assembly or Parliament?"

Suggested key reasons for devolution 
Managing director of Ginsters Mark Duddridge has outlined what he believes to be key reasons that Cornwall would benefit from increased devolution powers citing:
expertise in handling public money at a large scale in Cornwall
good understanding and working relationship with local partners and good outcomes for investors (following the experience of the previous devolution)
good local knowledge and success with the previous devolution
the slow pace of working with national partners with the UK government & risk of losing investors
tradition in Cornwall as an international trading area
securing £14/15 million of investment in the space of two weeks due to good knowledge of business and investors
the following businesses in Cornwall: emerging offshore wind business, geo-resources, geoscience, lithium business, database business, space business

Devolution report 
A report by the Institute for Public Policy Research (IPPR), an independent think tank, suggested that Cornwall has "outgrown" the original devolution deal of 2015.

Sarah Longlands, director of IPPR North suggested that Cornwall needs "the power and resources to be able to get on and get the job done, rather than wait for central government to make the next move" and that based on their research "it is clear that Cornwall has made the best of the fairly limited decentralisation deal that it was originally offered." Longlands also suggested that due to the decline of the hospitality industry during the COVID-19 pandemic and "the uncertainty of Brexit, now is the time to give Cornwall real devolution which means that they have the economic powers and resources they need to support a strong and fair recovery.”

Council devolution ambitions 

 The leader of Cornwall's council has called for devolution of second home tax powers to the Cornish Council, much like in Wales so that local residents are better able to afford local housing in their own communities.
 The council has ambitions for further devolution for Cornwall which includes further control over planning and taxation in order to better manage tourism in Cornwall.
 The council also wants devolution powers for a Cornish Freeport, including Newquay Airport and Falmouth docks.
 Cornish freeport including Newquay Airport and Falmouth Docks is another ambition.
 Control over the academic year, including being able to divide it into four terms.
 The ability to value properties for council tax.
 Investment in green technology.

All Under One Banner: St Piran's Day 
An "All Under One Banner" march occurred on the 19th of March in Cornwall to both celebrate St Piran's Day and promote greater autonomy for Cornwall and a greater discussion on its future.

See also

Cornish related pages 

 Cornish nationalism
 Constitutional status of Cornwall
 Cornish Assembly

Other major related movements 

 Breton nationalism
 Welsh nationalism
 Welsh independence
 Pan-Celticism
 List of active autonomist and secessionist movements

References 

Cornwall
Devolution in the United Kingdom
Home rule in the United Kingdom
Identity politics in the United Kingdom
Regionalism (politics) in the United Kingdom
Politics of Cornwall